Edward Albert Herr (January 4, 1883 – March 18, 1950) was an American player and head coach of college football, and a physician.

Biography
Herr was a 1906 graduate of Dartmouth College, where he played football for four years as a halfback and end. He then served as head coach of the New Hampshire football team in 1906 and 1907, and for the Vermont football team in 1908. In his three seasons as a head coach, Herr compiled an overall 6–13–6 record, for a  winning percentage.

In August 1906, Herr saved two women from drowning following a canoe accident in Squam Lake in New Hampshire. Following his time as a head coach, Herr earned his medical degree at the University of Vermont and went on to practice medicine in Hartford, Connecticut; Boston, Massachusetts; and Waterbury, Connecticut. He died in March 1950 at Saint Mary's Hospital in Waterbury, following a brief illness.

Head coaching record

Notes

References

1883 births
1950 deaths
People from Waterbury, Connecticut
Dartmouth Big Green football players
New Hampshire Wildcats football coaches
Vermont Catamounts football coaches
University of Vermont alumni
Players of American football from Connecticut
Coaches of American football from Connecticut
Physicians from Connecticut